César Alexandre Debelle (Voreppe, Isère, 27 November 1770 – 19 July 1826) was a French general. He was created a baron of the Empire in 1808. He was the cavalry brigade commander at the Battle of Sahagún, where his force was heavily defeated by British hussars under Henry, Lord Paget. His name is inscribed on the north side of the Arc de Triomphe. His brother Jean-François Joseph Debelle was also a general.

Sources

1770 births
1826 deaths
People from Voreppe
Barons of the First French Empire
French generals
Military leaders of the French Revolutionary Wars
French commanders of the Napoleonic Wars